This is a list of the States of India ranked in order of percentage of children between 12–23 months of age
who received all recommended vaccines. This information was compiled from National Family Health Survey - 4 published by International Institute for Population Sciences.

List

Union Territory by vaccination coverage

Notes

References 

Vaccination coverage
Vaccination